The second season of Let's Dance began on 14 May 2007 and was hosted by Hape Kerkeling and Nazan Eckes. Joachim Llambi, Michael Hull, Markus Schöffel returned as Judges, Katharina Witt was replaced by Ute Lemper.

Couples

Judges scores

Red numbers indicate the lowest score for each week
Green numbers indicate the highest score for each week
 the couple eliminated that week
 the winning couple
 the runner-up couple
 the third-place couple

Average chart 
This table only counts for dances scored on a traditional 40-point scale.

Highest and lowest scoring performances

Couples' highest and lowest scoring performances
According to the traditional 30-point scale.

Weekly scores and songs

Week 1

Individual judges scores in charts below (given in parentheses) are listed in this order from left to right: Michael Hull, Ute Lemper, Markus Schöffl, Joachim Llambi.
Running order

Week 2

Individual judges scores in charts below (given in parentheses) are listed in this order from left to right: Michael Hull, Ute Lemper, Markus Schöffl, Joachim Llambi.
Running order

Week 3

Individual judges scores in charts below (given in parentheses) are listed in this order from left to right: Michael Hull, Ute Lemper, Markus Schöffl, Joachim Llambi.
Running order

Week 4

Individual judges scores in charts below (given in parentheses) are listed in this order from left to right: Michael Hull, Ute Lemper, Markus Schöffl, Joachim Llambi.
Running order

Week 5

Individual judges scores in charts below (given in parentheses) are listed in this order from left to right: Michael Hull, Ute Lemper, Markus Schöffl, Joachim Llambi.
Running order

Week 6
Individual judges scores in charts below (given in parentheses) are listed in this order from left to right: Michael Hull, Ute Lemper, Markus Schöffl, Joachim Llambi.

Running order

Week 7
Individual judges scores in charts below (given in parentheses) are listed in this order from left to right: Michael Hull, Ute Lemper, Markus Schöffl, Joachim Llambi.

Running order

Week 8
Individual judges scores in charts below (given in parentheses) are listed in this order from left to right: Michael Hull, Dieter Bohlen, Markus Schöffl, Joachim Llambi.

Running order

Dance chart

 Highest scoring dance
 Lowest scoring dance
 Danced, but not scored
The celebrities and professional partners danced one of these routines for each corresponding week:
 Week 1: Cha-Cha-Cha or Waltz
 Week 2: Rumba or Quickstep
 Week 3: Jive or Tango
 Week 4: Paso Doble or Foxtrot
 Week 5: Samba and Group Viennese Waltz (not scored)
 Week 6: Both unlearned dances form Week 1&2
 Week 7: Both unlearned dances form Week 3&4
 Week 8: Favourite Latin & Ballroom routine & Freestyle (not scored)

Let's Dance (German TV series)
2007 German television seasons